SC 143 was a North Atlantic convoy of the SC series which ran during the battle of the Atlantic in World War II.
It was the second  battle in the Kriegsmarines autumn offensive in the North Atlantic.

Background

Following the attack on convoys ONS 18 and ON 202 by the wolfpack Leuthen, U-boat Control (Befehlshaber der Unterseeboote (BdU) was convinced of success and eager to continue the offensive.
Accordingly, they re-organized the boats then in the North Atlantic into a new patrol line, the 12 remaining Leuthen boats being joined by 9 newcomers, from bases in France and Germany. Code-named Rossbach, the group was stationed at the western edge of the Greenland Air Gap to intercept the expected east-bound convoys, carrying materiel for the invasion of Europe.

For their part, the Allies were also encouraged by the outcome of the battle for ONS 18/ON 202, and were keen to seek battle with group Rossbach.

While forming, Rossbach came under attack by air patrols; four boats were destroyed, and another four were damaged and forced to return to base. Three others were damaged, but were able to continue operations, while a further two boats arrived from base as re-inforcement.

Protagonists

SC 143 left Halifax on 28 September 1943 bound for Liverpool It was composed of 39 ships and was escorted by C-2 escort group comprising the destroyer , frigate Duckworth and 5 corvettes. Also accompanying the convoy was the MAC carrier .

By 6 October Rossbach, comprising fourteen U-boats at this point, was deployed to intercept the expected west-bound convoys, HX 259 and SC 143.

Western Approaches Command became aware of Rossbachs position via intelligence, principally Enigma decrypts, but decided to engage the wolfpack and force a battle.
Diverting HX 259 to the south, SC 143 was reinforced with 10th Support Group, of four destroyers, Musketeer, Oribi, Orkan and Orwell, and allowed to continue towards Rossbach as bait.

Action

SC 143 was sighted on 8 October by U-731, which was returning to base following an air attack; she sent a sighting report, and throughout the day the Rossbach boats converged on the position.

Seven boats had gathered by evening, and at nightfall mounted their attack.

During the night of 8/9 October the seven Rossbach boats were able to attack; 
 torpedoed and sank Yorkmar, and  hit  which sank with the loss of  157 men. This was the worst naval loss suffered by the Polish Navy during the war.

During the day the convoys air cover was able to mount several successful attacks; 
three U-boats were attacked by aircraft during the day.
 was attacked and sunk by a Liberator from No. 86 Squadron RAF;  
 was damaged by 2 other Liberators, from 86 Sqdn RAF and No. 120 Squadron RAF; it was later caught on the surface by another Liberator of RAF 86 Sqdn and sunk. 
 was attacked by a Sunderland from 423 Sqdn RCAF and sunk.

Two other boats were damaged in air attacks and forced to return to base; 

Following this the attack was discontinued by BdU and Rossbach, now reduced to six boats, was disbanded. SC 143 continued its voyage, and arrived without further loss at Liverpool on 12 October 1943.

Conclusion

Undeterred by the poor result of this attack, and the losses suffered by Rossbach, BdU wished to press on with the offensive; the remaining Rossbach boats were reinforced to form  a new group code-named Schlieffen.

Tables

Allied ships sunk

Allied warships sunk

Axis submarines destroyed

Notes

References
 Clay Blair : Hitler's U-Boat War [Volume 2]: The Hunted 1942–1945 (1998)  (2000 UK paperback ed.)
 Arnold Hague : The Allied Convoy System 1939–1945 (2000) ISBN (Canada) 1 55125 033 0 :   ISBN (UK) 1 86176 147 3
 Paul Kemp  : U-Boats Destroyed  ( 1997) . 
 Axel Neistle  : German U-Boat Losses during World War II  (1998) .  
 Stephen Roskill : The War at Sea 1939–1945   Vol III (1960)  ISBN (none)
 Jak P M Showell : U-Boat Warfare: The Evolution of the Wolf-Pack  (2002)

External links
 SC 143 on convoyweb
 SC 143 at warsailors

SC143
Naval battles of World War II involving Canada
C